The Bishop of Galloway, also called the Bishop of Whithorn, was the eccesiastical head of the Diocese of Galloway, said to have been founded by Saint Ninian in the mid-5th century. The subsequent Anglo-Saxon bishopric was founded in the late 7th century or early 8th century, and the first known bishop was one Pehthelm, "shield of the Picts". According to Anglo-Saxon ecclesiastical tradition, the bishopric was founded by Saint Ninian, a later corruption of the British name Uinniau or Irish Finian; although there is no contemporary evidence, it is quite likely that there had been a British or Hiberno-British bishopric before the Anglo-Saxon takeover. After Heathored (fl. 833), no bishop is known until the apparent resurrection of the diocese in the reign of King Fergus of Galloway. The bishops remained, uniquely for Scottish bishops, the suffragans of the Archbishop of York until 1359 when the pope released the bishopric from requiring metropolitan assent.  James I formalised the admission of the diocese into the Scottish church on 26 August 1430 and just as all Scottish sees, Whithorn was to be accountable directly to the pope.  The diocese was placed under the metropolitan jurisdiction of St Andrews on 17 August 1472 and then moved to the province of Glasgow on 9 January 1492. The diocese disappeared during the Scottish Reformation, but was recreated by the Catholic Church in 1878 with its cathedra at Dumfries, although it is now based at Ayr.

Pre-Reformation bishops

List of known Anglo-Saxon bishops of Whithorn

Heathored is described as the successor to Beadwulf by some accounts. His inclusion on the list as a Bishop of Whithorn is not credible.

List of known bishops of Galloway/Whithorn

Post-Reformation bishops

Church of Scotland succession

Scottish Episcopal Church succession
{| class="wikitable"
|- align=left
! width="25%"|Tenure
! width="35%"|Incumbent
! width="40%"|Notes
|- valign=top bgcolor="#ffffec"
|1689–1697|| John Gordon||After the Glorious Revolution, he continued as a nonjuring bishop until resigned the see in 1697. Later converted to Roman Catholicism and took the name James Clement Gordon.
|- valign=top bgcolor="#ffffec"
|1697–1731 ||colspan=2|See administered by the bishops of Edinburgh|- valign=top bgcolor="#ffffec"
|1731–1733 || David Freebairn||Also Primus (1731–1738) and Bishop of Edinburgh (1733–1739)
|- valign=top bgcolor="#ffffec"
|1733–1837 ||colspan=2|See administered by the bishops of Edinburgh|- valign=top bgcolor="#ffffec"
|colspan=3|In 1837, the see became part of the united bishopric of Glasgow and Galloway|- valign=top bgcolor="#ffffec"
|align=center colspan=3| Source(s):
|}

Restored Roman Catholic succession
The modern Bishop of Galloway is the Ordinary of the Roman Catholic Diocese of Galloway in the Province of Saint Andrews and Edinburgh.

The diocese was resurrected on 4 March 1878 from the Vicariate Apostolic of the Western District.  The church of Saint Andrew in Dumfries served as pro-cathedral until it was destroyed by a fire in May 1961 and the seat moved to Ayr in 1962.  The current bishop, appointed 2014,  is the Right Reverend William Nolan the 8th Bishop of Galloway. The diocese covers an area of 9,332 km².  The see is in the Ecclesiastical City of Ayr. Until 2007 the seat was located at the Cathedral Church of the Good Shepherd which was built in 1957. In early 2007 Pope Benedict XVI accepted the petition of Right Reverend John Cunningham, the 7th Bishop of Galloway, to move the seat to St Margaret's Church, Ayr. After this took place, the Church of the Good Shepherd was closed and largely demolished.

(Any dates appearing in italics indicate de facto  continuation of office.  The start date of tenure below is the date of appointment or succession. Where known, the date of installation and ordination as bishop are listed in the notes together with the post held prior to appointment.)

See also
 Prior of Whithorn

Notes

References

 Clancy, T. O. "The real St Ninian," in The Innes Review, 52 (2001)
 Dowden, John, The Bishops of Scotland, ed. J. Maitland Thomson, (Glasgow, 1912)
 Hudson, Benjamin T., "Kings and Church in Early Scotland", in The Scottish Historical Review, Vol. 73, (October, 1994), pp. 145–70
 Oram, Richard, The Lordship of Galloway, (Edinburgh, 2000)

 Bishops of Galloway